Dialogue with the Carmelites (also known as The Carmelites) is a 1960 French-Italian historical drama film written and directed by Raymond Léopold Bruckberger and Philippe Agostini. It is based upon the play by Georges Bernanos, which in turn was adapted from the novel by Gertrud von Le Fort. It's the story of the Martyrs of Compiègne, Carmelite nuns who were guillotined in Paris in 1794 in the waning days of the Reign of Terror during the French Revolution, after refusing to renounce their vocation.

Plot    
During the difficult years of the French Revolution, the young noblewoman Bianca, on the advice of her father, the Marquis de la Force, decided to enter the cloistered convent of the Carmelites of Compiègne. The need to find a safe refuge is accompanied by a certain religious vocation, but, despite this, Bianca is afraid of facing sacrifices and suffering and is afraid of not being up to her choice.

Soon the revolutionary authorities and the people will begin to annoy the nuns, accused of being reactionary, enemies of the homeland, who grab riches and give hospitality to the fugitives. Forced to leave the convent, the nuns vow to be willing to sacrifice their lives so that the Catholic religion can survive in France.

Dispersed in small groups, almost all of them will be arrested, found guilty and sentenced to death. The procession that accompanies them to the Square of the Reversed Throne, where the execution will take place, will cross the streets of Paris between prayers, blessings and religious songs. Bianca de la Force, with courage, will climb the gallows in place of Mother Mary of the Incarnation, who will be the only one to be saved and who alone will have to continue to practice the teaching of Carmel.

Cast
 Jeanne Moreau : Mère Marie de l'Incarnation
 Alida Valli :  Mère Thérèse de Saint-Augustin  
 Madeleine Renaud : First Prioress
 Pascale Audret : Blanche de la Force
 Pierre Brasseur : Commissioner of the Revolution
 Jean-Louis Barrault : Mime
 Anne Doat : Sister Constance de Saint-Denis
 Georges Wilson : Chaplain of the Carmel
 Pascale de Boysson : Sister Cécile
 Hélène Dieudonné : Sister Jeanne de la Divine Enfance 
 Pierre Bertin : Marquis de la Force
 Claude Laydu : Chevalier de la Force
 Daniel Ceccaldi :  Officier
 Judith Magre : Rose Ducor

References

External links

1960 films
Films directed by Philippe Agostini
Drama films based on actual events
Films based on works by Georges Bernanos
Films set in the 1790s
French Revolution films
1960s historical drama films
French historical drama films
Italian historical drama films
1960s French-language films
1960s French films
1960s Italian films